Beauty Nomvuzo Dlulane is a South African politician who has been a Member of Parliament (MP) for the African National Congress since 2003.

She is currently the Chairwoman of the Portfolio Committee on Sport & Recreation.

References 

Living people
Members of the National Assembly of South Africa
Women members of the National Assembly of South Africa
African National Congress politicians
21st-century South African women politicians
21st-century South African politicians
Year of birth missing (living people)